Minnie Steppler (1889-1964) was an American film editor and occasional screenwriter active during the late 1920s.

Biography 
Minnie was born in Ventura County, California, to John Stewart and Sara Todd. She was married to Harry Steppler.

Selected filmography 

 Broken Hearted (1929)
 China Slaver (1929)
 Girls Who Dare (1929)
 The Candy Kid (1928)
 Must We Marry? (1928)
 The Little Wild Girl (1928)
 Old Age Handicap (1928)

References 

American film editors
American women film editors
1889 births
1964 deaths